Lobatae may refer to:

 The Latin plural term for "lobed" (singular lobata), occurring in a scientific description
 The Latin possessive form of lobata, as in:
 Flos Puerariae Lobatae, medicinal preparations from the flowers of Pueraria lobata, Kudzu
 Radix Puerariae Lobatae, medicinal preparations from the root of Pueraria lobata, Kudzu

Plants 
  Section Lobatae of genus Quercus, the red oaks, also known as Erythrobalanus
 Sections or Series of other plant genera, including:
 Calceolaria, a genus of plants in the family Calceolariaceae
 Hyptis, widespread in the tropics and warmer temperate regions of the Americas
 Passiflora, a genus of about 500 species of flowering plants
 Saxifraga, a genus containing about 440 known species of Holarctic perennial plants